Sacaba Municipality is the first municipal section of the Chapare Province in the Cochabamba Department, Bolivia. Its seat is Sacaba.

Subdivision 
Sacaba Municipality is divided into six cantons.

See also 
 Pukara Mayu
 Q'inqu Mayu
 Rocha River
 Warawara Lake

References 

Municipalities of the Cochabamba Department